Rashid Yunusmetov (Raşid Iunusmetov; born July 9, 1979 in Shymkent) is a Kazakhstani sport shooter. Yunusmetov had won a total of five medals at the ISSF World Cup circuit, including gold for the 50 m free pistol (2009 in Beijing, China).

Yunusmetov represented Kazakhstan at the 2008 Summer Olympics in Beijing, where he competed in two pistol shooting events. He placed twentieth out of forty-eight shooters in the men's 10 m air pistol, with a total score of 578 points. Three days later, Yunusmetov competed for his second event, 50 m rifle pistol, where he was able to fire 10 shots each in six attempts, for a total score of 555 points, finishing only in seventeenth place.

References

External links
ISSF Profile
NBC 2008 Olympics profile

Kazakhstani male sport shooters
Living people
Olympic shooters of Kazakhstan
Shooters at the 2008 Summer Olympics
Shooters at the 2016 Summer Olympics
People from Shymkent
1979 births
Asian Games medalists in shooting
Shooters at the 2002 Asian Games
Shooters at the 2006 Asian Games
Shooters at the 2010 Asian Games
Shooters at the 2014 Asian Games
Asian Games silver medalists for Kazakhstan
Asian Games bronze medalists for Kazakhstan
Medalists at the 2002 Asian Games
Medalists at the 2006 Asian Games
Shooters at the 2018 Asian Games